Baird Inlet (literally ‘big lake’) is a 35-mile-long (56 km) bay in the Yukon-Kuskokwim Delta in the U.S. state of Alaska. It borders Nelson Island and is drained primarily by the Ninglick and Kolavinarak Rivers. 

Ivan Petrof named the inlet for Spencer Fullerton Baird in 1880. The Eskimo name is "Nunavarok" according to a 1949 U.S. Coast and Geodetic Survey report.

References

Bays of Alaska
Bodies of water of Bethel Census Area, Alaska